Ferndale is a borough in Cambria County, Pennsylvania, United States. It is part of the Johnstown, Pennsylvania Metropolitan Statistical Area. The population was 1,636 at the 2010 census, down from 1,834 at the 2000 census.

Geography
Ferndale is located in southwestern Cambria County at  (40.287974, -78.918091). It is bordered to the north by the city of Johnstown, to the west by the unincorporated community of Elim, and to the east and south by the Stonycreek River, across which to the south is Riverside.

Demographics

As of the census of 2000, there were 1,834 people, 792 households and 521 families living in the borough. The population density was 5,198.2 per square mile (2,023.2/km2). There were 849 housing units at an average density of 2,406.3 per square mile (936.6/km2). The racial makeup of the borough was 98.47% White, 1.15% African American, 0.11% Native American, 0.05% Asian, and 0.22% from two or more races. Hispanic or Latino of any race were 0.22% of the population.

There were 792 households, of which 28.4% had children under the age of 18 living with them, 52.7% were married couples living together, 10.0% had a female householder with no husband present, and 34.2% were non-families. 30.3% of all households were made up of individuals, and 14.6% had someone living alone who was 65 years of age or older. The average household size was 2.32 and the average family size was 2.88.

In the borough, the population was spread out, with 21.6% under the age of 18, 7.5% from 18 to 24, 28.5% from 25 to 44, 23.8% from 45 to 64, and 18.5% who were 65 years of age or older. The median age was 40 years. For every 100 females there were 88.5 males. For every 100 females age 18 and over, there were 83.5 males.

The median income for a household in the borough was $32,617, and the median income for a family was $41,438. Males had a median income of $28,750 versus $20,000 for females. The per capita income for the borough was $25,750. About 4.1% of families and 8.9% of the population were below the poverty line, including 15.8% of those under age 18 and 8.6% of those age 65 or over.

Transportation
Ferndale is located on Pennsylvania Route 403; Route 985 is nearby.

The borough is located on a CSX rail line; the nearest passenger train service is in nearby Johnstown, as is the Johnstown-Cambria County Airport.

References

Populated places established in 1785
Boroughs in Cambria County, Pennsylvania
1896 establishments in Pennsylvania